Lesle Lewis is an American poet and professor. She is author of five poetry collections, most recently "A Boot's a Boot", winner of the 2013 Cleveland State University Poetry Center Open Book Competition.  In reviewing her previous collection, lie down too, winner of the 2010 Beatrice Hawley Award, (Alice James Books, 2011). Publishers Weekly, wrote "Few poets handle both syntax and sound as she does, and few flirt so well both with, and against, common sense, with and against ordinary adult experience." Her first collection, Small Boat (University of Iowa Press, 2003), won the 2002 Iowa Poetry Prize. Her poems have been published in many literary journals and magazines including American Letters and Commentary, Green Mountains Review, Barrow Street, Pool, The Hollins Critic, The Massachusetts Review, and Jubilat, and featured on the Academy of American Poets website.

Lewis earned a B.S. in education at the New York University, an M.A.L.S. in English at Keene State College, and an M.F.A. in poetry from the University of Massachusetts Amherst. She teaches at Landmark College in Putney, Vermont, and lives in Alstead, New Hampshire.

Published works

 Rainy Days on the Farm. Fence Books, 2019
 A Boot's a Boot. Cleveland State University Poetry Center, 2014
 It's Rothko in Winter or Belgium. Factory Hollow Press, 2012 
 lie down too. Alice James Books, 2011
 Landscapes I & II. Alice James Books, 2006
 Small Boat. University of Iowa Press, 2003

References

External links
 Alice James Books > Lesle Lewis > Author Page
 University of Iowa Press > Author Page > Lesle Lewis
 Landmark College > Faculty Bio > Lesle Lewis
 Author Profile: New Hampshire State Council on the Arts > Arts & Artists > Featured Poet
 Poem: Jubilat > Issue 13 > Lesle Lewis > The Continent Behind the College
Poems: Shampoo Poetry > Issue 14 > Lesle Lewis
 Poem: Double Room > Issue #6, Fall 2005/Winter 2006 > Lesle Lewis > Yours Is a Contemplative Wine

Living people
Poets from New Hampshire
New York University alumni
Keene State College alumni
University of Massachusetts Amherst MFA Program for Poets & Writers alumni
American academics of English literature
People from Alstead, New Hampshire
American women poets
American women non-fiction writers
Year of birth missing (living people)
21st-century American women writers